Elkanah Angwenyi (born 5 February 1983 in Nyamira) is a Kenyan runner who specializes in the 1500 metres. He won the bronze medal at the 2006 World Indoor Championships.

He started running while at primary school. He was recruited by Kenya Police in 2001. In 2004 he was spotted by Hussein Makke, who became his manager and sent him to the US, where he has since competed at various road and track races.

Angwenyi is married with a son born in 2003 (as of 2006).

Competition record

Personal bests 
 800 metres - 1:46.3 min (2005)
 1500 metres - 3:31.97 min (2006)
 3000 metres - 7:43.28 min (2004)

External links 
 
 IAAF: Focus on Athletes

1983 births
Kenyan male middle-distance runners
Living people
Kenyan male long-distance runners